Corbyn Smith (born 5 August 1998) is a Canadian ice sledge hockey player who was on the Canadian team that earned a silver medal in para ice hockey at the 2018 Winter Paralympics. As a child he had a neuroblastoma, which affected his abdomen and spine.

References

External links 
 
 

1998 births
Living people
Canadian sledge hockey players
Paralympic sledge hockey players of Canada
Paralympic silver medalists for Canada
Para ice hockey players at the 2018 Winter Paralympics
Medalists at the 2018 Winter Paralympics
Paralympic medalists in sledge hockey